Harker Creek is a stream located in Tooele County, Utah, United States.
The upper portion of the creek forms Harker Canyon, and drains from west to east on the southern side of the Sheeprock Mountains, a small mountain group in the larger Wasatch Range. The lower portion of the creek drains from south to north into Rush Valley, where it enters the watershed of Faust Creek. It drains into the Rush Valley at its northern end at 1762 m (5780 ft) above sea level. At its highest point, the creek is at approximately 1900 m (6300 ft) elevation.

See also
List of rivers of Utah

Rivers of Tooele County, Utah
Rivers of Utah